Jerry Mandy (June 5, 1892 – May 1, 1945) was an American film actor. He appeared in 114 films between 1923 and 1945. He was born in Utica, New York and died in Hollywood, California from a heart attack five weeks before his 53rd birthday.

Selected filmography

 North Star (1925)
 Behind the Front (1926)
 You'd Be Surprised (1926)
 Thundering Fleas (1926)
 Crazy Like a Fox (1926)
 45 Minutes from Hollywood (1926)
 Raggedy Rose (1926) - the chauffeur
 Señorita (1927)
 Eve's Love Letters (1927)
 Underworld (1927)
 With Love and Hisses (1927)
 The Gay Defender (1927)
 It's a Gift (1934)
 Rainbow's End (1935)
 Two for Tonight (1935)
 Unknown Woman (1935)
 King of Burlesque (1936)
 Behind the Mike (1937)
 Boys of the City (1940)
 One Night in the Tropics (1940)  
 Too Many Blondes (1941)

References

External links

1892 births
1945 deaths
American male film actors
20th-century American male actors